Like nouns in many Native American languages, the Tlingit noun is easily conceptualized but difficult to formally define. It can be simple or compound, and can be derived from verb forms as well as other nouns. It is marked for case, but not normally for number. Noun possession divides all nouns into two open classes of possessable and unpossessable nouns, and the possessable nouns are further divided based on their alienability.

What is a noun?

The concept of a noun is fairly well defined for Indo-European languages, as well as many other language families. However, it is not so clear for many Native American language families, particularly the Na-Dené family. Beck (2001) proposes that nouns should not be restricted to single words and compounds, at least for Native American languages, instead that any conventionalized expression that meets certain semantic and syntactic criteria of “nouniness” should be admitted to the class of nouns. These criteria for nominal entries in the lexicon are, per Beck:

 semantic
 must have a conventionalized meaning expressing a semantic KIND
 must be conceptually autonomous
 syntactic
 must be unmarked as a syntactic actant
 must be syntactically closed, i.e. must have a core syntactic valency of zero

Tlingit has a large number of noun-like constructions which appear on the surface to be phrases, but which are fixed in both meaning and morphology.

Thus to cope with nouns in Tlingit it is necessary to expand the idea of a noun from a single word-form to a word or phrase which roughly meets Beck’s criteria for nouniness. Otherwise a large class of phrasal forms which behave like nouns must be left unanalyzed.

Possession

Nouns in Tlingit can be divided into two open classes, possessable and unpossessable. This division is based on whether a particular noun may have a possessed relationship with another noun, both syntactically and semantically. In Tlingit the names for people and places, called proper nouns in English grammar, are unpossessable, other nouns may be either optionally or obligatorily possessed. Words for kinship and body parts must be possessed because they always exist in relationship to someone or something. The possessive pronouns are used with the inalienable nouns while the alienable nouns gain a possessive prefix.

Possessable nouns are marked for possession in the form of the possessed case using the -ÿi possessed suffix. It is  a manner opposite of the English possessive case: When a given noun, e.g., hít (“house, building”) is possessed by some other noun, e.g. Jáan (“John”), it is marked with the -ÿi suffix, thus Jáan hídi means “John’s house”.

Names are unpossessable nouns in Tlingit. It is thus syntactically inadmissible for a name to be possessed by another noun. A construction such as Alice’s John referring to for example the husband of a woman named Alice, is acceptable in colloquial English. However, in Tlingit such a construction is impossible, so *Anis Jáani is nonsensical.

Possessive pronouns

indefinite human possessive pronoun meaning someone’s/somebody’s = ḵaa

The suffix -i shows that the noun is possessed or owned, or connected to another noun. For words that end in a vowel, insert /y/ before adding the ending -i

For example:

 ax̱ dóoshi = my cat
 haa héeni = our river
 ax̱ l’ee x’wáni = my socks

Allomorphy

As is apparent in the previous examples, the -ÿi suffix has a number of allomorphs depending on the phonological environment of the preceding syllable. If the final syllable ends with a vowel then the ÿ is realized as y and the suffix is -yi. If however it ends with a consonant then the ÿ is dropped giving only -i. If it ends with a rounded vowel then the ÿ is realized as w and the i is backed and rounded, giving the suffix -wu. If it ends with a labialized consonant then the suffix is -u and it “steals” the labialization from the consonant. (This latter example of progressive assimilation of rounding and labialization is actually a productive process in Tlingit, and for some speakers may apply across word and phrase boundaries as well as within words.)

Tone is always opposite that of the final syllable, so a low tone final causes the suffix to take high tone, and vice versa. Final aspirated stops are deaspirated when suffixed; this is a regular process in all Tlingit suffixation that is usually but not always represented in writing.

The allomorphy of this suffix derives from phonological adaptation after the loss of the ÿ consonant. Hypothetically this suffix was in the past always -ÿi, but the ÿ was either palatalized or labialized into modern y or w respectively. In many situations in Tlingit morphology a similar process has occurred subsequent to the devolvement of ÿ, further muddying the waters of allomorphy. For clarity the schematic form of the suffix is always given as -ÿi to avoid confusion with the various phonetic realizations and with other similar suffixes.

This complexity of allomorphy for the -ÿi possessed suffix may be easier to understand schematically, and a set of production rules are given below. In these rules the symbol A indicates an unrounded vowel (e.g. i, a), the symbol O indicates a rounded vowel (e.g. u, oo), the symbol C indicates an unrounded consonant (e.g. k, t), and the symbol W indicates a rounded consonant (e.g. kw, x'w). Vowels are additionally marked with tone, thus Á indicates an unrounded high tone vowel (e.g. á, ée). Vowel length has no effect and is thus unmarked.

 -Á + -ÿi → -Áyit'áa + -ÿi → (du) t'áayi “(his) board”
 -A + -ÿi → -Ayíshaa + -ÿi → (du) shaayí “(his) mountain”
 -Ó + -ÿi → -Ówu[example pending]
 -O + -ÿi → -Owúgishoo + -ÿi → (du) gishoowú “(his) pig”
 -ÁC + -ÿi → -ÁCihít + -ÿi → (du) hídi “(his) house”
 -AC + -ÿi → -ACíaan + -ÿi → (du) aaní “(his) village”
 -OC + -ÿi → -OCú[example pending]
 -ÓC + -ÿi → -ÓCukhóok + -ÿi → (du) khóogu “(his) box”
 -AW + -ÿi → -ACúyaakw + -ÿi → (du) yaagú “(his) boat”
 -ÁW + -ÿi → -ÁCu[example pending]

Possessable nouns are themselves completely subdivided further into two open classes, alienable and inalienable nouns.

Alienability

In Tlingit, nouns are subject to the concept of alienability.

Most nouns in Tlingit are alienable, i.e., they may be used alone or may be possessed by another noun. When possessed they are marked with the -ÿi possessed suffix discussed above. The term “alienable” refers to the idea that these words can be used on their own, thus conceptually they can be alienated from other nouns.

All inalienable nouns have an obligatory possessed relationship with another noun. They generally refer to kinship, body parts, and spatiophysical relationships. They are most commonly associated with a possessive pronoun as the possessor, e.g. axh tláa “my mother”, du xh'é “his mouth”. They may however belong to any noun, e.g. dóosh jín “cat's paw”. Occasionally they are compounded into more complex nouns, e.g. du jintáak “his palm” from du jín “his hand” and at táak “its inside surface”.

A notable feature of inalienable nouns is that they are not normally marked for possession, i.e. they do not take the possessed -ÿi suffix. The possessive relationship in this case is implicit in the meaning of the noun and thus need not be syntactically marked. It is however possible to add the possessed suffix to an inalienable noun, particularly those referring to body parts. In this case the meaning changes from being part of a body into being a body part that is somehow separated from the rest of the body. This is analogous to the same process of optional possession in English, thus xóots shá means “a bear’s head”, but xóots shayí means “a bear head” or “a bear’s head detached from its body”.

Citation forms of inalienable nouns are usually indicated with a preceding dummy possessor noun. For human possession this is du “his, its” or khaa “person's”, and for all other nouns it is at or a “its”. If an inalienable noun is not distinguished in this manner it is difficult for nonnative speakers to determine the noun's class. In dictionaries the dummy possessor noun is ignored for alphabetic sorting.

Adnominal modifiers

There are two types of adnominal modifiers, the prenominal and postnominal modifiers. These are words or clitics which are positioned before or after a noun or noun phrase and which modify its meaning or syntactic function in some manner.

Prenominal modifiers

Prenominal modifiers include the numbers, possessive pronouns, and a small group of other descriptive modifiers which can be comfortably called adjectives.

Prenominal adjectives

The list below is taken from Leer et al. (2001, p. 21)

 ch'a aanínáxh — ordinary, common, everyday
 shich — female
 yées — new, young, fresh
 khustin, khudziteeyi — giant
 aak'é — good, fine
 aatlein — much (amount or intensity), a lot, lots

Numbers

Possessive pronouns

Postnominal modifiers

The postnominal modifiers are morphologically diverse, consisting of enclitics, suffixes, and certain specialized possessive constructions. They usually postpose or attach to nouns, but can also apply to noun phrases. The nominal cases can also be analyzed as being postnominal modifiers, for which see below.

Postnominal adjectives

A small closed class of adjectives exists as postnominal modifiers, e.g. tlein “big” and yéis “young”.

Plural

A plural suffix -x'  exists which may be attached to most nouns, however it is not usually used. A few nouns are treated as singular/plural pairs, e.g. khaa/khaax'w “person”/“people”, du yádi/du yátx'i “his child”/“his children”. In addition to the plural suffix -x'  there are two postnominal modifiers which indicate plurality of kin terms (excepting “child” which takes -x'  as above).

Diminutive

The diminutive suffix -k'  functions similarly to the plural suffix -x' . It may be suffixed to any noun, producing a diminutive form that indicates small size, endearment, or occasionally a derivative or dependent position.

Nominal cases

Nominal cases in Tlingit are designated by postpositions as with most SOV languages, however they usually behave morphologically like suffixes. Case in Tlingit is a somewhat problematic feature because the cases semantically function as do case suffixes in other languages, but can be expanded to whole noun phrases like phrasal postpositions rather than being restricted to individual nouns as with typical case suffixes. They thus fall somewhere in between suffixes and enclitics. This problem can be crudely accounted for by treating noun phrases as discrete nouns if they are syntactically closed, but this solution itself opens up another can of theoretical worms. Therefore, in the interests of simplicity and readability the terms “postposition”, “suffix”, and “case” are used interchangeably in this article without any particular theoretical implications.

Cases mark both nouns and pronominals. The latter are typically formed by adding a possessive pronominal prefix to the base -.i-.

Final syllables of the shape CÓ (where C is a consonant and Ó is a high tone vowel) are usually lengthened before postpositions. Exceptions are the anaphor á “it, that”, the relational nouns ká “surface” and yá “face”, and the pronominal bases xha- “1st person singular”, du- “3rd person neutral”, tu- “reflexive“, khu- “indefinite human”, and -.i- “pronominal base”.

Ergative

The ergative postposition is -ch. It marks the agent of a transitive verb with a definite object. The meaning is roughly “by means of” and is consistent with other split ergative languages. When discussing the two arguments of the verb in an ergative sentence, the marked agent is called the "ergative argument" and the definite object is called the "absolutive argument". Note that Tlingit lacks an absolutive case, instead the absolutive argument is not marked.

In the following example the patient of the verb yajaakh “to kill” is the definite object xhat “me”, the agent is the subject tá “sleep”. This is a metaphor indicating that the speaker is tired, that the desire to sleep has overcome him.

In the next example the patient of the verb si.ee “to cook” is the definite object phrase wéi dleey “that meat”, and the agent is Jáan “John”. In this instance the absolutive argument is postposed to follow the verb because it is topically unfocused. In the previous example the absolutive argument is a pronoun and hence does not need to be extraposed.

A common use of the ergative in oratory and storytelling among other situations is the phrase ách áwé “because of that; following that; that's why”. This is also an example of the use of a demonstrative construction as a sort of copula.

Punctual

The punctual postposition is -t. The name is from Latin punctus “point”.

When used with a positional imperfective it designates physical position, roughly meaning “(resting) at”.

When used in a telic derivative it means “(coming) to”, “(arriving) at”. E.g.,

In an atelic na-aspect derivative it means “(moving) about”.

Pertingent

The pertingent postposition is -xh.

It can mean an extended physical location or extended contact with an object, e.g. “(usually or always) at”.

In another sense it indicates repetitive physical arrival, as in “repeatedly arriving at”, “always coming to”.

In a third sense it indicates physical status, i.e. “in the form of”. Consider:

In the above example the main clause is relativized. Its argument, optional in this case, is lingít “people”.

It is probable that the adverb yáxh which indicates similarity of the subject with the object is originally derived from yá “face”. Thus yá + -xh > yáxh “like, similar”. This construction is used as follows:

Using the proposed derivation of yáxh this example could literally be translated as “(its appearance or behavior) is in the form of the ‘face’ of a canoe".

Locative

The locative postposition is -x' with the variant forms -: (lengthened vowel), -0 (phonologically null value), and -i.

It may indicate physical location, such as “at a place”, “by a place”, “in a structure”.

It is extended by analogy to temporal location, such as “at a time”, “by a time”.

The locative has allomorphs under the following conditions:
 -: lengthened vowel after CÓ
 -0 null phoneme after long vowels CO: or CÓ:
 -i after all consonants

Note that the locative suffix in the form -x'  is phonetically indistinguishable from the plural suffix -x' . This collision is less problematic than it might seem on the surface because the plural suffix is rarely used, and furthermore the two have different ordering with respect to the possessed suffix -ÿi.

Adessive

The adessive postposition is -ghaa. Leer calls this vicinitative in his dissertation, but the typical term is adessive as used in e.g. Finnish and Hungarian.

Its primary meaning indicates physical adjacency to place or object, such as “around {a place or object}”, “by {a place or object}”. By extension of this concept it may indicate physical succession, “(go) after something” or “(follow) something”, as well as the temporal associations of “(waiting) for something” and ”about (a time)”, “around (a time)”.

Ablative

The ablative postposition is -dáxh with an allomorph -dxh after open (vowel-final) syllables.

It marks the physical origin of an action, translated as “from (a place)” or “out of (a place)”. By temporal extension it means “since (a time)” or “from (a time)”.

Prolative

The prolative postposition is -náxh. Leer calls this perlative in his dissertation, and the same grammatical case is sometimes termed prosecutive.

It marks a course of physical translation by some action, translated as “along (a way)” or “via (a path)”. Temporal extension indicates the translation of an action along a duration of time, or the inclusion of a period of time, thus “during (some period)”, “including (some time)”.

A frequent use is in describing speech or language. The noun phrase for language is generally (du) yoo xh'átángi, but when speaking of a thing said in a particular language, the term is (du) xh'éináxh.

Allative

The allative postposition is -dei.

It marks a physical or temporal destination, translated as “to, toward” and “until”, respectively. It may also describe an analogical motion, “in the manner of“.

Comitative-instrumental

The comitative-instrumental (or simply comitative) postposition is -tin with allophones -n and -.een.

It may describe either the instrumental “with (a utensil)”, “by means of (something)”, or the comitative “with (something, someone)”, “along with (something, someone)”.

Locative-predicative

The locative predicative postposition is -u. It functions as a postposition plus a nonverbal predicate.

Relational postpositions

Similar to the nominal cases, and in many respects confused with them, are the relational postpositions. These are not properly speaking cases because they convert the phrase to which they are appended from an NP to a PP. Their behavior has more in common with the relational nouns than with nominal cases per se.

The major relational postpositions are:

 ghóot — “without”
 nákh — “away from”
 yís — “for”
 yáxh — “like, as much as, according to”
 yánáxh — “more than”
 khín — “less than”

Noun derivation

A large number of nouns in Tlingit are derived from verb stems and roots. There are a number of different processes by which noun derivation can occur. If divided based on suffix, five distinct paradigms can be counted.

Conversion

The simplest deverbal noun derivation is conversion from a verb stem.

Agentive -ÿi

The agentive derivational suffix -ÿi is homophonous with the attributive verb suffix, however the agentive requires -I in the classifier as with the other derivational forms. The Tlingit agentive suffix has a similar meaning to the English agentive suffix -er, as in the words “writer”, “speaker”, “seller”.

The above form is distinct from the homophonous (du) yoo xh'atángi “(his) language; (his) speech” which is the possessed form of the conversion yoo xh'atánk.

Instrumentive -aa

Story (1966) calls this derivational suffix the “instrumental”, however to avoid confusion with the instrumental case it is here termed the “instrumentive”. It is homophonous with the partitive pronominal object agreement verb prefix aa- (slot +12). It is also phonologically similar to the noun á which is realized as áa with the locative or possessed suffixes (i.e. áa < á-x'  or á-ÿí), to which this instrumentive suffix may be historically related.

Patientive -adi

Fragmentive -dasi

Borrowing

Borrowing from other languages into Tlingit is largely restricted to nouns, likely because the complex morphology of the Tlingit verb prevents the easy adaptation of foreign verbs. As a counterexample, there is at least the verb du-ÿa-spelled, as seen in the spelling book Aan Aduspelled X'úx' .

Prehistoric borrowing is essentially unstudied. It seems likely that Tlingit did borrow to some extent from neighboring languages such as Haida and Tsimshian, but to what extent is unknown.

Historically, Tlingit has borrowed from Russian, Chinook Jargon, and English. Borrowings from other languages have been mediated through these particular languages. The earliest borrowings were taken from Russian, for example chayu “tea” from чай (chai) and káaxwei “coffee” from кофе (kofe).

 cháyu “tea” < Rus. чаю  “tea-GEN”, from чай  in genitive case used as a partitive, e.g. in the phrase давай попём чаю “let’s drink some tea”.
 káaxwei 'coffee' < Rus. кофе  'coffee'
 sawáak 'guard dog, big dog' < Rus. собака  'dog'
 Anóoshee 'Russian' <? Rus. (из) Алюшии  'from Aleutia'

Chinook Jargon

Chinook Jargon was a lingua franca widely used on the Northwest Coast by American traders (“Boston men”), British traders ("King George men"), laborers, miners, fishermen, loggers, and many Indian tribes. Borrowings into Tlingit from English and Chinook Jargon occurred contemporaneously until the early 20th century. Native English speakers would have some command of Chinook Jargon when immigrating from other places in the Northwest, and as a consequence would tend towards using it rather than English with monolingual Tlingit speakers. Oral history confirms that many Tlingit speakers in the late 19th and early 20th century were also fluent in Chinook Jargon, some even with native proficiency.

Because the two languages coexisted, it is often difficult to tell whether a particular borrowing is taken directly from English into Tlingit, or instead whether it was imported through the intermediary of Chinook Jargon. Chinook Jargon phonology is much closer to Tlingit phonology than is English, and as such a direct borrowing from English into Tlingit is likely to closely resemble a borrowing from English into Chinook Jargon. Thus, a number of Tlingit nouns which are commonly assumed to be of English origin are more likely indirect imports through Chinook Jargon. A prime example is dáana “money, dollar, silver”, which superficially is similar to its English counterpart, but in fact has a semantic range that resonates with the Chinook Jargon dala “money, dollar, silver coin”. This relationship can be clearly seen in the Tlingit compound wakhdáana “eye glasses” (lit. “eye silver”) which is cognate with the Chinook Jargon dala siyawes “eye glasses” (lit. “silver eye”).

Many derivations from Chinook Jargon account for what current Tlingit speakers consider to be opaque words that describe foreign concepts but which lack a clear English or Russian heritage. The opacity of these terms is because few speakers today have any familiarity with Chinook Jargon.

Some derivations from Chinook Jargon are given below. Note that they mostly pertain to foreign animals and people, and foodstuffs which could be obtained through trade with Europeans.

 doosh “cat” < CJ pushpush  (northern var. of CJ puspus )
 wasóos “cow” < CJ moosmoos “cow, buffalo” 
 gishóo “pig” < CJ gosho  < Fr. le cochon wanadóo “sheep” < CJ lemoto  < Fr. le mouton gawdáan “horse” < CJ kiwutan  < Sp. caballo + Sahaptian -tan ending
 dáanaa “dollar, money, silver” < CJ dala  < Eng. dollar gút “dime, ten cents” < CJ bit  < Eng. bit “ten cents, one eighth of a Spanish dollar” (see bit (money))
 kwáadaa “quarter” < CJ kwata  < Eng. quarter gwáta “butter” < CJ bata  < Eng. butter sakwnéin “bread, flour” < CJ saplil  < Chinook sapollil or tsapelil shóogaa “sugar” < CJ shuga  < Eng. sugar naaw “alcohol” < CJ lam  < Eng. rum s'ísaa “cloth” <? CJ laswa  < Fr. le soie (silk)
 nahéin “lahal” < CJ lahal  (a NW coast game played with small sticks and sleight of hand, often called “the stick game” in English)
 Wáashdan “American” < CJ Bashtan  < Eng. Boston Kínjichwaan “Canadian, English” < CJ Kinchuch  “Canadian, English” + man  “man” < Eng. King George + man Cháanwaan “Chinese” < CJ Chanman “Chinese”  < Eng. Chinaman Jawanée “Japanese” < CJ Japanee “Japanese”  < Eng. Japanee Dáchwaan “German” < CJ Duchman “German, misc. European”  < Eng. Dutch “German”
 Gwasyóoks “French” < CJ Pasiuks “French”  < Chinook pasi “French” (< Fr. Français) + -uks “animate plural”
 Kanaka “Hawaiian” < CJ kanaka “Hawaiian”  < Hawaiian kanaka “person”
 X'wátlaan “Portland” <? CJ Patlan  < Eng. PortlandA few Tlingit nouns that are derived from Chinook Jargon have an ambiguous pronunciation in Tlingit despite the fact that the pronunciations involve distinct Tlingit phonemes. Examples are sgóon/shgóon “school” and sdóox/shtoox “stove”. These ambiguities can be explained by noting that in Southeast Alaska there was no single predominant variety of Chinook Jargon spoken, and as such a single Chinook Jargon word might be borrowed from speakers of different Chinook Jargon dialects with differing pronunciations.

There are a few nouns in Tlingit which are essentially Tlingit compounds of existing nouns, but whose structure is probably influenced by cognates in Chinook Jargon. The previously mentioned wakhdáana “eyeglasses” is one example. Another is dikée aankháawu “God”, literally “high up aristocrat”. This word is a creation of Christian missionaries, probably coined as a direct translation of the Chinook Jargon sagali tayee “God”, literally “high up chief”. Unlike the Chinook Jargon tayee, Tlingit lacks a noun that translates well to “chief”, but the term aankháawu “aristocrat” (lit. “person of the town”) is a close substitute. Some money terms were constructed from a mixture of Chinook Jargon and native Tlingit terms, for example gút shuwú “nickel” and dáanaa shuwú'' “fifty cents”.

References

Tlingit culture